The Glorious Heresies is a novel by Irish author Lisa McInerney, published in 2015 by John Murray. The novel is set in Cork, Ireland. The plot explores drug and alcohol abuse, religion and organised crime.

Summary
The narrative follows a young man called Ryan as he struggles with family issues and the Irish criminal underworld.

Reception
The Glorious Heresies received mostly positive review. The Irish Times described the book as "biting, moving and darkly funny". The Guardian criticised the novel for lacking in energy during its final third but said McInerney "has talent to burn".

Awards
The novel was the winner of the Women's Prize for Fiction in 2016.

References

2015 Irish novels
Novels set in County Cork
John Murray (publishing house) books
Women's Prize for Fiction-winning works